The Vitznau–Rigi Railway is a Swiss standard gauge rack railway that runs from  on the shore of Lake Lucerne to Rigi. It was built in 1871 by the Rigibahn, and is now owned by Rigi Railways, along with the Arth–Rigi Railway, which runs on the other side of the mountain, and the Weggis–Rigi Kaltbad cable car (Luftseilbahn Weggis–Rigi Kaltbad, LWRK).

History

The Vitznau–Rigi railway (VRB) was opened on 21 May 1871 as the Rigibahn and the first mountain railway in Europe. The first rack railway of Europe had already been opened in the quarry of Ostermundigen in 1870. The quarry was officially opened for marketing reasons only in October 1871. The Vitznau–Rigi Railway was built by the engineers Niklaus Riggenbach, Ferdinand Adolf Naeff and Olivier Zschokke. At first it ran only from Vitznau (439 metres above sea level) via Kaltbad (1453 m.a.s.l.) to Rigi Staffelhöhe (1550 m.a.s.l.). On 27 June 1873, the railway was extended to Rigi Kulm (1752 m.a.s.l.). This section is located in the canton of Schwyz, for which the VRB had no concession. The track belonged to the ARB and was leased by the VRB. The line is mostly single track, but the line has been double-track since 1874 from the request stop of Freibergen to Rigi Kaltbad-First.
 
The Rigibahn was only open in the summer in the early years. Winter sports gradually developed and operations in the winter commenced.
 
The narrow-gauge Rigi–Scheidegg railway (Rigi-Kaltbad-Scheidegg-Bahn, RSB) to Rigi Scheidegg, which was completed in 1875, began in Kaltbad. This railway was closed in 1931 and finally abandoned in 1942. The Weggis–Rigi Kaltbad cable car (Luftseilbahn Weggis–Rigi Kaltbad, LWRK) from Weggis, also operated by the Rigi Railways, has ended in Kaltbad since 1968.
 
The Vitznau–Rigi Railway (officially called the Vitznau-Rigi-Bahn since 1 January 1970) connects in Rigi Staffel with the tracks of the Arth–Rigi Railway, which has operated from  since 1875. The VRB used a track that ran parallel with the track of the ARB to the common terminus in Rigi Kulm. Both railways were once strictly separated and competitors. The only connection was a transfer table in front of the joint depot building on Rigi Kulm. It was not until 1990 that a connecting track was built between the ARB and the VRB in Rigi Staffel. This was the beginning of the merger, which was completed in 1992.
 
The VRB switched to electric traction in 1937 and an overhead line was erected on the Vitznau–Rigi Kulm line. The traverser in Freibergen was replaced by a rack railway set of points in 1959; the same occurred in Kaltbad in 1961. These sets of points were replaced by new systems in 2000 and 2012. In 2012, the station complex in Kaltbad was completely renewed and a second platform track was installed. The station building in Kaltbad was demolished; construction of the new building started in May 2014 and was finished in September 2014. The new Kaltbad station building was inaugurated on 1 March 2015.

Technical data
The railway has the following technical data:

Electrical system

Speed

Rolling stock

 1 electric locomotive of 331 kW (no. 18)
 4 electric motor cars of 330 kW (no. 1–4)
 1 electric motor cars of 752 kW (no. 5)
 2 electric push-pull sets of 824 kW (no. 21–22)
 1 snow plough of 309 kW (not self-propelled)
 2 steam locomotives of 340 kW (no. 16–17)
 9 passenger cars
 13 freight wagons, official vehicles, snow ploughs etc.

Notes

References

Footnotes

Sources
 
 
 

Railway lines in Switzerland
Standard gauge railways in Switzerland
Rack railways in Switzerland
Railway lines opened in 1871
1871 establishments in Switzerland
Mountain railways
1500 V DC railway electrification
Rigi Railways lines